Lockerbie Scrub is a 230 km2 area of closed forest and woodland, surrounded by open tropical savanna woodland, at the northern tip of the Cape York Peninsula in Far North Queensland, Australia.

Description
The Scrub consists of lowland rainforest, eucalypt tall open forest and closed eucalypt woodland.  The rainforest type represented there is predominantly semi-deciduous notophyll vine forest growing upon a number of different soil types. The climate is monsoonal with well-defined wet and dry seasons.  Land tenure is mainly Aboriginal (Deed of Grant in Trust) land, with pockets of freehold around the communities of New Mapoon and Bamaga.

Fauna

Mammals
Northern quolls, spectacled flying foxes and bare-backed fruit bats occur in the Lockerbie Scrub.

Birds

Some 158 km2 of the Lockerbie Scrub has been identified by BirdLife International as an Important Bird Area (IBA) because it is a significant migratory bottleneck for spangled drongos and rainbow bee-eaters, as well as supporting populations of lovely fairywrens and yellow-spotted honeyeaters.

Also present in the area are several birds whose Australian range is limited to the Cape York Peninsula, including palm cockatoos, yellow-billed kingfishers, Papuan pittas, trumpet manucodes, magnificent riflebirds, fawn-breasted bowerbirds, northern scrub robins, yellow-legged flycatchers, tropical scrubwrens and frill-necked monarchs.  The endangered southern cassowary was recorded in Lockerbie Scrub in 1986 but is now probably extinct there.  Bush stone-curlews, silver-crowned friarbirds and yellow honeyeaters have been recorded on rare occasions.  Graceful honeyeaters are common. White-streaked honeyeaters are present.

References

Geography of Far North Queensland
Important Bird Areas of Queensland